Severance may refer to:

Arts and entertainment
Severance (film), a 2006 British horror film
Severance (novel), a 2018 novel by Ling Ma
Severance, a 2006 short-story collection by Robert Olen Butler
Severance (TV series), a 2022 Apple TV+ sci-fi series
Severance (album), by Daysend, 2003
Severances, a 1989 album by Masami Akita, recording as SCUM
 "Severance", a 1988 song by Dead Can Dance from The Serpent's Egg
Severance: Blade of Darkness, a 2001 fantasy action video game

Finance and law
Severance (land), the division of land that does not require a plan of subdivision
Severance, the ending of a joint tenancy other than by death
Severance package, pay and benefits when an employee leaves a firm
Severance tax, a tax on non-renewable natural resources

Structures
Severance Hall, a concert hall in Cleveland, Ohio, US
Severance Hospital, in Seoul, Korea

Places in the United States
Severance, Colorado
Severance, Idaho, now Careywood
Severance, Kansas
Severance Township, Sibley County, Minnesota
Severance, New York
Severance Lake, a lake in Sibley County, Minnesota

People
Alexander Severance (1905–1985), American basketball player and coach
Avery W. Severance (1819–1874), New York assemblyman
Carol Severance (1944–2015), American science fiction writer
Caroline Severance (1820–1914), American abolitionist and suffragist
Charles Severance (computer scientist), American computer scientist and academic
Charles Severance (serial killer) (born 1960), American serial killer
Cordenio Severance (1862–1925), American lawyer
Dave Severance (1919–2021), American Marine Corps officer
Frank Severance (1856–1931), American historian
H. Craig Severance (1879–1941), American architect
Joan Severance (born 1958), American actress
John L. Severance (1863–1936), American businessperson
Juliet Stillman Severance (1833–1919), American physician and feminist
Louis Severance (1838–1913), American oilman
Luther Severance  (1797–1855), American diplomat

See also